Sarah Barlondo is a British-French actress and disability activist known for her role in Wonder Woman 1984 and her work the Mexican television series Un Refugio para el Amor produced by Televisa

She also appeared on La Fuerza del Destino, Ni contigo ni sin ti, Esperanza del Corazón, La Guerre des Miss by Patrice Leconte

Biography
Raised in the South of France, trained in Mexico City, Paris, and New York, Sarah is a professionally trained TV, film, and theater actress. Sarah honed her craft at the Cours Florent in Paris, Centro de Educación Artística in Mexico City, and the Lee Strasberg Theatre and Film Institute in New York, before appearing in French feature films La Guerre des Miss, and the Televisa Mexico series Un Refugio para el Amor, Ni Contigo, Ni Sin Ti, and La Fuerza del Destino. Outside of her acting and modeling work, Sarah is a forensic architect. She pursued her passion for architecture and humanitarian design, completing studies at Parsons in New York, and the Architectural Association and Central St Martins in London, graduating with honors and winning the Design for Peace award in 2018. Before her career as an actress, Sarah was a top-ranked ITF and WTA professional tennis player.

In 2018, obtained a role in the new Wonder Woman directed by Patty Jenkins and produced by Warner Bros. The feature film will be released in June 2020.

Filmography
 Wonder Woman 1984 directed by Patty Jenkins (2020)
 Framed directed by Nick Rizzini (2020)
 Él & Elle directed by Kenneth Müller, Pablo Dominguez, Sarah Barlondo, Fernando Perezgil, Vanessa Palacios, Luis Torrecilla (2020)
 La Fuerza del Destino (The Power of Destiny) (2011) as Jenny
 Ni contigo ni sin ti (With you...without you) (2011) as Sara
 Esperanza del Corazón (Hoping Heart) (2011) as Constanza
 Un Refugio para el Amor (A Refuge For The Love) (2012) as Aranza

References

External links
 

Living people
French television actresses
French actresses
British actresses
Telenovela actresses
Year of birth missing (living people)